Pilar Mardones (born ) is a professional Chilean female beach volleyball player, playing as an outside hitter. She was part of the Chile women's national volleyball team.

She participated at the 2011 Women's Pan-American Volleyball Cup, and at the 2015 Pan American Games.
On club level she played for Boston College in 2011.

References

External links
http://www.bvbinfo.com/player.asp?ID=14928
https://eldeportero.cl/francisca-rivas-y-pilar-mardones-quieren-conquistar-el-circuito-mundial-de-volleyball-playa/
 

1989 births
Living people
Chilean women's volleyball players
Place of birth missing (living people)
Beach volleyball players at the 2015 Pan American Games
Outside hitters
Expatriate volleyball players in the United States
Boston College Eagles women's volleyball players
Chilean expatriate sportspeople
Chilean expatriates in the United States
Pan American Games competitors for Chile